Basic For Qt is the successor of KBasic and an object-oriented framework related to VB.NET and Visual BASIC, as well as an integrated development environment. It is designed to run on multiple platforms. Pre-compiled binaries are available for Mac, Windows and a few Linux distributions. Source code is also available.

See also 
 List of BASIC dialects
 Gambas

References 

BASIC programming language family
Free integrated development environments
Linux integrated development environments
Object-oriented programming languages
Procedural programming languages
Programming languages created in 2000
BASIC compilers
BASIC interpreters
Free software
Software that uses Qt
Linux programming tools
Software using the GPL license
User interface builders